Intelligent speed assistance (ISA), or intelligent speed adaptation, also known as alerting, and intelligent authority, is any system that ensures that vehicle speed does not exceed a safe or legally enforced speed. In case of potential speeding, the driver can be alerted or the speed reduced automatically.

Intelligent speed assistance uses information about the road to determine local speed limits. Information can be obtained from knowledge of the vehicle position, taking into account speed limits known for the position, and by interpreting road features such as signs. ISA systems are designed to detect and alert a driver when a vehicle has entered a new speed zone, or when different speed limits are in force according to time of day and conditions. Many ISA systems also provide information about driving hazards (e.g. high pedestrian movement areas, railway crossings, schools, hospitals, etc.) and limits enforced by speed and CCTV cameras at traffic lights. The purpose of ISA is to assist the driver to maintain a safe speed.

History 

After ISA regulation entered into force in the EU on 8 July 2022, a speed limiter ISA law entered into force in the UK on 6 July. Regulation does not enter into force the same day due to Brexit.

Terminology 
Intelligent speed adaptation is the terminology of the British Standards Institute, while the EU refers to intelligent speed assistance, in regulation (EU) 2019/2144 of the European Parliament.

Active and passive ISA 
Passive systems warn the driver when the vehicle is travelling in excess of the speed limit, while active systems slow the vehicle's speed to conform with the speed limit. Passive systems allow the driver to make a choice on what action should be taken. These systems usually display visual or auditory cues and warnings, which and may include tactile cues such as vibration in the accelerator pedal. Some passive ISA technology trials have made the accelerator pedal stiffer to alert the driver.

Most active ISA systems allow the driver to override the ISA when deemed necessary; this is thought to enhance public acceptance and safety, but leaves a significant amount of speeding unchecked.

Both active and passive ISA systems can serve as on-board vehicle data recorders, retaining information about vehicle location and performance for later checking and fleet management purposes.

Speed and location determination and verification 
There are four types of technology available for determining local speed limits on a road and the speed of the vehicle:
 Position-based systems
 Radio beacons
 Optical recognition
 Dead reckoning

Position-based systems 
GPS is based on a network of satellites that constantly transmit radio signals. GPS receivers pick up these transmissions and compare the signals from several satellites in order to pinpoint the receiver's location to within a few meters. This is done by comparing the time at which the signal was sent from the satellite to when it was picked up by the receiver. Because the orbital paths of the satellites are known, the receiver can perform a calculation based on its distance to several of the orbiting satellites and therefore obtain its position. There are currently 31 satellites making up the GPS network, and their orbits are configured so that a minimum of five satellites are available at any one time for terrestrial users.

Radio beacons
Roadside radio beacons, or bollards, work by transmitting data to a receiver in the car. The beacons constantly transmit data that the car-mounted receiver picks up as it passes each beacon. This data could include local speed limits, school zones, variable speed limits, or traffic warnings. If sufficient numbers of beacons were placed at regular intervals, they could calculate vehicle speed based on how many beacons the vehicle passed per second. Beacons could be placed in/on speed signs, utility poles, other roadside fixtures, or in the road itself. Mobile beacons could be deployed in order to override fixed beacons for use around accident scenes, during poor weather, or during special events. Beacons could be linked to a main computer so that quick changes could be made.

The use of radio beacons is common when ISA systems are used to control vehicle speeds in off-road situations, such as factory sites, logistics and storage centres, where occupational health and safety requirements mean that very low vehicle speeds are required in the vicinity of workers, and in situations of limited or obscured visibility.

Optical recognition systems
Optical recognition technology has focused on recognizing speed signs, road markings and roadside objects such as "cat's eyes". This system requires the vehicle to pass a speed sign or similar indicator and for data about the sign or indicator to be registered by a scanner or a camera system. As the system recognizes a sign, the speed limit data is obtained and compared to the vehicle's speed. The system uses that speed limit until it detects a speed sign with a different limit.

It is also possible to use computer vision to determine the assured clear distance ahead.

Dead reckoning 
Dead reckoning (DR) uses a mechanical system linked to the vehicle's driving assembly in order to predict the path taken by the vehicle. By measuring the rotation of the road wheels over time, a fairly precise estimation of the vehicle's speed and distance travelled can be made. Dead reckoning requires the vehicle to begin at a known, fixed point. Then, by combining speed and distance data with factors such as the angle of the steering wheel and feedback from specialized sensors (e.g., accelerometers, flux gate compass, gyroscope) it can plot the path taken by the vehicle. By overlaying this path onto a digital map, the DR system knows approximately where the vehicle is, what the local speed limit is, and the speed at which the vehicle is travelling. The system can then use information provided by the digital map to warn of upcoming hazards or points of interest and to provide warnings if the speed limit is exceeded.

Dead reckoning is prone to cumulative measurement errors such as variations between the assumed circumference of the tyres compared to the actual dimension (which is used to calculate vehicle speed and distance travelled). These variations in the tyre circumference can be due to wear or variations in tyre pressure due to variations in speed, payload, or ambient temperature. Other measurement errors are accumulated when the vehicle navigates gradual curves that inertial sensors (e.g. gyroscopes and/or accelerometers) are not sensitive enough to detect or due to electromagnetic influences on magnetic flux compasses (e.g., from passing under power lines or when travelling across a steel bridge) and through underpasses and road tunnels.

Some top-end GPS-based navigation systems currently on the market use dead reckoning as a backup system in case the GPS signal is lost.

Limitations and objections 
A principle limitation to ISA is that it could result in driving to the posted speed limit rather than local conditions. Road features such as curves and gradients may require a lower speed than the posted maximum speed limit. Some studies of ISA do not support this objection.

Increasingly, road authorities indicate the appropriate speed for such segments through the use of advisory speed signage to alert drivers on approach that there are features which require a reduction in travelling speed. It is recognised that the speed limit databases used in ISA systems should ideally take account of posted advisory speeds as well as posted maximum speed limits. The New South Wales ISA trial in the Illwarra region south of Sydney currently is the only trial to post advisory speeds as well as posted maximum speed limits.

Some car manufacturers have expressed concern that some types of speed limiters take control away from the driver. Some ISA systems do have provision for over-ride by the driver in the event that the set speed is inappropriate.

For some traffic safety practitioners, active intelligent speed adaptation is thought to be an example of 'hard automation', an approach to automation that has been largely discredited by the Human Factors community. An inviolable characteristic of human users is that they will adapt to these systems, often in unpredictable ways. Some studies have shown that drivers 'drive up to the limits' of the system and drive at the set speed, compared to when they are in manual control, where they have been shown to slow down. Conversely, the experience of some drivers with driving under an active ISA system has been that they find they can pay more attention to the roadway and road environment as they no longer need to monitor the speedometer and adjust their speeds on a continuing basis.

Intelligent speed adaptation has also been held as an example of a technology which, like speed cameras, can alienate some drivers, forming a significant barrier to its widespread adoption.

Some studies which pre-date the development of ISA systems indicated that drivers make relatively little use of the speedometer and instead use auditory cues (such as engine and road noise) to successfully regulate their speed.

ISA regulations may prompt the disappearance of models that cannot be re-designed to accommodate the necessary sensors. For example, Toyota's GR86 will go off sale in Europe after 2024, as its existing roofline cannot accommodate an ISA sensor.

If speed signs are not present, an ISA system may be unable to function. This is a particular problem when exiting a side road onto a main road, as the vehicle may not pass a speed sign for some distance. Driving between alternate countries using metric and imperial systems may be a further challenge.

Benefits 
A British study estimates that ISA could reduce fatalities by half.

RTA (NSW Australia) ISA trial results showed the benefits of ISA are improved speed zone compliance with reduction in the level and duration of speeding.

A cost-benefit analysis of ISA (in Australia) published in April 2010 by the Centre for Automotive Safety Research suggested that advisory ISA would reduce injuries by 7.7% and save $1.2 billion per year; supportive ISA would reduce injuries by 15.1% and $2.2 billion; limiting ISA would reduce injuries by 26.4% and save $3.7 billion. This research resulted in the recommendation for wider adoption and promotion of ISA in the Australian National Road Safety Strategy 2011–2020.

Real and perceived benefits of ISA also include noise reduction and exhaust emissions.

Commercial use 
ISA is in widespread commercial use in Australia, partly due to initiatives from by various state road authorities and the inclusion of ISA in the National and State Road Safety Strategies.

In the EU, commercial vehicles such as the 2022 EU-spec Volkswagen Amarok can be bought with ISA.

Implementation in the EU and UK

Definition under EU law
Under EU regulation, intelligent speed assistance (ISA) system shall comprise a speed limit information function (SLIF) and either a speed limit warning function (SLWF) or a speed control function (SCF):

ISA mandatory in the EU for new vehicles from July 2022

In 2012, five out of the 35 governments associated with the ETSC agreed to introduce ISA in all commercial vehicles.

By 2013, adoption of the technology was being considered by the European Commission but was being strongly opposed by the UK transport secretary, Patrick McLoughlin. A government spokesman described the proposal as "Big Brother nannying by EU bureaucrats." In 2019, however, it was finally agreed to adopt the new technology in all new cars from July 2022 as per EU Directive 2019/2144. The framework for testing ISA systems is currently being defined.

The framework for testing ISA systems is specified by regulation 2021/1958 from 23 June 2021.

Criticism of ISA regulation in the EU
In September 2020 the European Transport Safety Council made three criticisms of European draft regulations for ISA:
 ISA systems alerted drivers only after they speed, rather than before
 systems may not be able to identify the correct speed limit
 some ISA systems may be disabled too easily
The ESTC restated these reservations in July 2022 while broadly welcoming ISA, describing it as "a giant leap forward...one of the life-saving systems with the most potential".

United Kingdom 
ISA is not yet mandatory in the United Kingdom.

See also 
 Advanced driver-assistance systems
 Intelligent transportation system
 Intelligent vehicle technologies
 Map database management
 Speed limiter
 Telematics
 Traffic sign recognition
 Usage-based insurance

References

Other references 
 Basnayake C, Mezentsev O, Lachapelle G and Cannon M (2004) "A Portable Vehicular Navigation System Using High Sensitivity GPS Augmented with Inertial Sensors and Map-Matching", SAE Paper 2004-01-0748.
 Biding T (2002) "Intelligent Speed Adaptation", Swedish National Road Administration.
 Calafell J, Foyer P and Porooshasp K (2000) "Navigation Systems in Europe: Past, Present and Future", SAE Paper 2000-01-1298.
 Carsten O (2000) "External Vehicle Speed Control – Executive Summary of Projects Results", University of Leeds, July 2000.
 Carsten O (2001) "ISA: the Best Collision Avoidance System?", Proceedings of 17th Conference on the Enhanced Safety of Vehicles, Netherlands.
 Carsten O (2004) "ISA – From Fields Trials to Reality", PACTS conference Targets 2010: No Room for Complacency, London, 10 February 2004.
 Carsten O and Tate F (2005) "Intelligent Speed Adaptation: Accident Savings and Cost-Benefit Analysis", Accident Analysis and Prevention 37, pp. 407–416 2005.
 ETSC (2006) "Intelligent Speed Assistance – Myths and Reality: ETSC Position on ISA", European Transport Safety Council, May 2006
 Faulks IJ (2007) "How fast am I going now? What is the speed limit? Vehicle-based measures to enable drivers to better monitor, manage and control speed: An examination of possible road safety countermeasures", Safety and Policy Analysis International, Sydney, NSW.
 Faulks IJ, Paine M, Paine D and Irwin JD (Eds)(2008) "ISA in Australia: Workplace Safety, Road Safety and the Commercialisation of Intelligent Speed Adaptation", Proceedings of the 1st Australian conference on Intelligent Speed Adaptation, held at Parliament House, Sydney, Wednesday 1 August 2007, Canberra, ACT, Australasian College of Road Safety.
 Harsha B and Hedlund J (2007) "Changing America’s culture of speed on the roads", AAA Foundation.
 Hatfield J and Job S (2006) "Beliefs and Attitudes about Speeding and its Countermeasures", Australian Transport Safety Bureau, Report B2001/0342, May 2006.
 IIHS (2002) "Faster Travel and the Price We Pay", Status Report Vol.38 No. 10, Nov 2003. Arlington.
 Kao W (1991) "Integration of GPS and Dead-Reckoning Navigation Systems", SAE Paper 912808.
 Kloeden C, McClean A, and Glonek G (2002) "Reanalysis of Travelling Speed and Risk of Crash Involvement in Adelaide, South Australia", Australian Transport Safety Bureau Report CR 207, April 2002.
 Mitchell-Taverner P, Zipparo L and Goldsworthy J (2003) "Survey on Speeding and Enforcement", Australian Transport Safety Bureau, Report CR 214a, October 2003.
 NHTSA (2005) "Analysis of Speeding-Related Fatal Motor Vehicle Traffic Crashes", Report DOT HS 809 839, August 2005.
 Nilsson G (1993) 'Relationship between speed and safety: calculation method', The Speed Review: Appendix of Speed Workshop Papers, Federal Office of Road Safety, Report CR127A, Department of Transport and Communications, Canberra.
 OECD/ECMT (2006) "Speed Management", Joint OECD/ECMT Transport Research Centre, October 2006.
 Page J (2005) "A Final Technical Report on the Belgium ISA Trial", Belgian Institute for Road Safety.
 Paine M (1996) "Speed Control Devices for Cars", report prepared for NSW Roads and Traffic Authority, May 1996.
 Paine M (1998) "Why Consider Speed Control Devices for Vehicles?", Developments in Safer Motor Vehicles Conference, NSW Parliament, March 1998.
 Paine M, Paine D, Griffiths M and Germanos G (2007) "In-vehicle Intelligent Speed Advisory Systems", Proceedings of the 20th International Conference on the Enhanced Safety of Vehicles Lyon, June 2007
 Paine MP, Magedara N & Faulks IJ (2008) "Expediting the Road Safety Benefits of Intelligent Vehicle technologies – Part 1: Main report", Report to the Transport Accident Commission of Victoria. Sydney, NSW: Vehicle Design & Research / Safety and Policy Analysis International.
 Paine M, Paine D and Faulks IJ (2009) "Speed Limiting Trials in Australia", Paper Number 09-0378 represented to the 21st Enhanced Safety of Vehicles (ESV) Conference, Stuttgart, 15–18 June 2009.
 Peltola H, Tapio J and Rajamaki R (2004) "Recording ISA in Finland", Via Nordica.
 Plowden S and Hillman M (1984) "Danger on the Road: The Needless Scourge". Policy Studies Institute. London.
 Regan M, Triggs T, Young K, Tomasevic N, Mitsopoulos E, Stephan K and Tingvall C (2006) "On-road Evaluation of ISA, Following Distance Warning and Seat Belt Reminder Systems: Final Results of the TAC Safecar Project", Monash University Accident Research Centre, September 2006.
 RTA (2005) "Road Traffic Crashes in New South Wales 2004", Roads and Traffic Authority.
 Wolley J (2005) "Recent Advantages of Lower Speed Limits in Australia", Journal of the Eastern Asia Society for Transportation Studies, Vol. 6, pp. 3562 – 3573, 2005.

Advanced driver assistance systems
Intelligent transportation systems